A mitochondrial encephalomyopathy is a form of encephalomyopathy that is associated with a mitochondrial disease.
MELAS syndrome
Examples include MELAS syndrome and MERRF syndrome. These conditions can sometimes present together.

KSS is sometimes included in this category, but it is not included in this category in MeSH.

References

External links 

Neurotrauma